Radspitze is a mountain of Bavaria, Germany.

Mountains of Bavaria
Mountains under 1000 metres
Kronach (district)